Wilfred Frost (born 7 August 1985) is a contributor for Sky News, NBC and CNBC.

Early life and education
Frost is the son of Sir David Frost, an interviewer and television host, and Lady Carina Fitzalan-Howard, a daughter of the 17th Duke of Norfolk. Frost attended Eton College and the University of Oxford, where he graduated with a degree in Politics, Philosophy, and Economics.

Career
After graduating, Frost worked for Newton Investment Management in London for 5 years. In 2011, after attending a weekend-long media-training programme in London, he left his job to pursue a career in broadcasting.

In 2014, Frost joined CNBC as the co-anchor of Worldwide Exchange, first from London and beginning in 2016, from the United States.

In 2018, Frost became co-anchor of Closing Bell.  On February 3, 2022, Frost announced his departure from Closing Bell to begin working with Sky News in London in March 2022.  Frost will remain with Comcast as an NBC/CNBC contributor.

Personal life
Frost's parents owned Michelmersh Court, a 21-acre estate in the south of England. There, he met Margaret Thatcher, John Major, Tony Blair, David Cameron, and George H. W. Bush.

In 2015, Frost's older brother, Miles, died from hypertrophic cardiomyopathy. His father had the same condition when he died as discovered in the autopsy but it was not what his father died of in 2013. In response, he and his younger brother, George, created the Miles Frost Fund, which works to raise awareness of and increase testing for this hereditary heart condition. Wilfred underwent hypertrophic cardiomyopathy screening and tested negative.

He is the godson of John Cleese.

References

Living people
1985 births
British broadcast news analysts
Television personalities from London
CNBC people
NBC News people